Euseius facundus is a species of mouse in the family Phytoseiidae.

References

facundus
Articles created by Qbugbot
Animals described in 1969